Leopold Friedrich (1 January 1898 – 1962) was an Austrian weightlifter who competed in the 1924 Summer Olympics. He won a bronze medal in the light-heavyweight class.

References

External links
 

1898 births
1962 deaths
Austrian male weightlifters
Olympic weightlifters of Austria
Olympic bronze medalists for Austria
Olympic medalists in weightlifting
Medalists at the 1924 Summer Olympics
Weightlifters at the 1924 Summer Olympics
20th-century Austrian people